Ariomma is a genus of deepwater, marine ray-finned fishes belonging to the family Ariommatidae.  Members of this genus are found in the Atlantic, Pacific and Indian Oceans.  Several members of this genus are of commercial importance as food fish.  This genus is currently the only known extant genus in its family.

Species
Currently, the 7 recognized species in this genus are:
 Ariomma bondi Fowler, 1930 (silver-rag driftfish)
 Ariomma brevimanus (Klunzinger, 1884)
 Ariomma indica (F. Day, 1871) (Indian driftfish)
 Ariomma lurida D. S. Jordan & Snyder, 1904 (ariommid)
 Ariomma melana (Ginsburg, 1954) (Brown driftfish)
 Ariomma parini Piotrovsky, 1987 (Parin's ariomma)
 Ariomma regulus (Poey, 1868) (spotted driftfish)

Timeline

References 

Ariommatidae
Perciformes genera
Marine fish genera
Taxa named by David Starr Jordan
Taxa named by John Otterbein Snyder